Boystown (stylized in logo as BOYS TOWN) was a child pornography website run through the Tor network as a hidden service.

Background 
As of May 2021, the website was considered the largest international darknet platform to host child pornography. The website had 400,000 registered users.

Website content 

The website featured various forums and chats for communication. The illegal images and videos were posted on the forums and the chats where members were able to communicate with one another. There were two chat services provided, one called "Lolipub" and the other was known as "BOYSPUB". The child abuse materials exchanged between users were of young children and toddlers, most of which were boys, from around the world. The child pornographic content had various categories including "Art" (which included shotacon among other subcategories), "hardcore", "kindergarten", and "toddler". Lolipub also had rules that included banning the promotion of hurtcore.

Website investigation 
The website was investigated by a German police task force with cooperation from Europol and international law enforcement agencies. The platforms administrators and users were under investigation for months.

Agencies involved in the investigation 

The following agencies took part in the investigation:

 : Australian Centre to Counter Child Exploitation (ACCCE), Australian Federal Police (AFP), Queensland Police Service (QPS)
 : Royal Canadian Mounted Police
 : Federal Criminal Police (Bundeskriminalamt)
: National Police (Politie)
 : Federal Bureau of Investigation (FBI), U.S. Immigration and Customs Enforcement (ICE)

Arrests 

There were three primary suspects that were discovered and identified during the investigation: a 40-year-old man from Paderborn, a 49-year-old man from Munich and a 58-year-old man from Northern Germany who was living in Paraguay. The suspects allegedly acted as administrators for the website and gave advice to its users on how to evade law enforcement while using the platform. Another suspect was a 64-year-old man from Hamburg who was accused of being one of the most active users uploading over 3,500 posts.

Website shutdown 
In mid-April 2021, the website was raided by authorities and shut down.

References 

Underground culture
Defunct Tor hidden services
Child pornography websites
Defunct darknet markets
Erotica and pornography websites
Internet properties established in 2019
Internet properties disestablished in 2021
Child pornography crackdowns